Martin "Bunky" Reid Park (also known as Martin Reid Town Park) is a park in New Cassel, in Nassau County, on Long Island, in New York, United States. It is located within and operated by the Town of North Hempstead.

Description 
The park is located in New Cassel, New York, and is named for Martin "Bunky" Reid (1951-1993), a prominent local who died of colon cancer. It features basketball courts, a pool, shuffleboard courts, horseshoe pits, a playground, picnic areas, and various sports fields.

In 2018, the Town of North Hempstead applied for a $30,000 grant in order to modernize the playground at the park.

See also 

 "Yes We Can" Community Center – A North Hempstead community center located near the park.

References 

Parks in Nassau County, New York
Town of North Hempstead, New York